Parides pizarro is a species of butterfly in the family Papilionidae. It is found in Colombia, Brazil, Bolivia and Peru.

Description
Abdomen in the male quite black, in the female with a red spot before the apex on the underside. Forewing without spots, also none in the fringes. Hindwing with whitish yellow area, which in the male consists of three or four spots, in the female of three to six. A full description is provided by Rothschild, W. and Jordan, K. (1906)

Taxonomy

Parides pizarro is a member of the chabrias species group

The members are
Parides chabrias 
Parides coelus 
Parides hahneli 
Parides mithras 
Parides pizarro 
Parides quadratus

Status
A rare species. Protected in Tambopata National Reserve in Peru.

Subspecies
 Parides pizarro pizarro (Staudinger, 1884)
 Parides pizarro kuhlmanni (E. May, 1925)
 Parides pizarro steinbachi  (Rothschild, 1905)  Forewing in both sexes with a large white spot before hind margin; hindwing with a red band. Bolivia.

Etymology
Named for Francisco Pizarro.

References

External links

pizarro
Papilionidae of South America
Taxonomy articles created by Polbot
Butterflies described in 1884